Polyacme is a genus of moths in the family Geometridae. The genus was described by Warren in 1896. Both species are from Australia.

Species
Polyacme dissimilis (Warren, 1897)
Polyacme subpulchra (Warren, 1897) Queensland

References

Geometridae